Schistometopum is a genus of amphibian in the family Dermophiidae. S. thomense is only known from two islands in the Bight of Benin, but has been reported from "Upper Zaïre". This likely refers to an undiscovered third species.

Species

References

 
Amphibian genera
Amphibians of Sub-Saharan Africa
Taxa named by Hampton Wildman Parker
Taxonomy articles created by Polbot